is a Japanese actor, voice actor and narrator from Tokyo. He is most known for the roles of Go Mifune (Mach GoGoGo), Joe Shimamura/009 (Cyborg 009 [1960s]), Ken the Eagle (Science Ninja Team Gatchaman), Jouji Minami (Tekkaman: The Space Knight), and Garma Zabi (Mobile Suit Gundam).

Biography
Mori was previously affiliated with Tokyo Actor's Consumer's Cooperative Society, then Aoni Production and now he is the founder of Office Mori.

Filmography

Television animation
1960s
Mach GoGoGo (1967) – Go Mifune
Cyborg 009 (1968) – Joe Shimamura a.k.a. 009
Attack No. 1 (1969) – Tsutomu Ichinose
1970s
Tiger Mask (1969) – Naoto Date/Tiger Mask (ep. 31~39)
Gatchaman (1972) – Ken the Eagle/G-1
Aim for the Ace! (1973) – Takayuki Tōdō
Cutey Honey (1973) – Seiji Hayami
Getter Robo (1974) – Shinichi Hayata
Tekkaman: The Space Knight (1975) – Jouji Minami/Tekkaman
Getter Robo G (1974) – Sakazaki
Dokaben (1977) – Shō Doigaki
Invincible Super Man Zambot 3 (1977) – Uchūta Kamie
Haikara-san ga Tooru (1978) – Shinobu
Mobile Suit Gundam (1979) – Garma Zabi
The Rose of Versailles (1979) – Robespierre
1980s
Armored Fleet Dairugger XV (1982) – Walter Jack
Ai Shite Knight (1983) – Satomi Okawa
Fist of the North Star (1984) – Shū and Zaria
Video Warrior Laserion (1984) – Inspire, Gario
Saint Seiya (1986) – Capella, Belzebub, Jaow, Gemini Cloth
Dragon Ball (1987) – Panputt
Sakigake!! Otokojuku (1988) – Gouji Akashi
Tatakae!! Ramenman (1988) – Victory Ramenman
Kiteretsu Daihyakka (1989) – Kiteretsu Kite
Dragon Quest (1989) – General Jikido
1990s
Dragon Ball Z (1990) – Nail
High School Mystery: Gakuen Nanafushigi (1991) – Sugimura
Trapp Family Story (1991) – Wasner
Pretty Soldier Sailor Moon (1992) – Nephrite
Ghost Sweeper Mikami (1993) – Count Brado
2000s
Detective Conan (2003) – Kazami
Fafner in the Azure: Dead Aggressor (2004) – Mitsuhiro Bartland
The Law of Ueki (2005) – Kobayashi
Real Drive (2008) – Masamichi Haru
Rosario+Vampire (2008) – Moka's Father
2010s
Katanagatari (2010) – Kiki Shikizaki
Panty & Stocking with Garterbelt (2010) - Arthur
Sket Dance (2011) – Funzō Takemitsu
Gatchaman Crowds (2013) – J.J.
Pocket Monsters: The Origin (2013) – Professor Oak
Z/X Ignition (2014) – Ayase's Father
2020s
Lucifer and the Biscuit Hammer (2022) – Ron Yue

Original video animation (OVA)
Legend of the Galactic Heroes (1988) – Wolfgang Mittermeyer
Record of Lodoss War (1990) – Shadam
JoJo's Bizarre Adventure (1993) – Jean Pierre Polnareff
Mobile Suit Gundam Unicorn: Episode 4 (2011) – Diner Owner

Animated films
Science Ninja Team Gatchaman: The Movie (1978)
Twelve Months (1980) – April
Future War 198X (1982) – Smirnov
Odin: Photon Sailer Starlight (1985) – Mitsuo Itami
Saint Seiya: Legend of Crimson Youth (1988) – Lynx Jaō
Saint Seiya: Warriors of the Final Holy War (1989) – Seraph Beelzebub
Doraemon: Nobita and the Animal Planet (1990) – General Nimuge

Video games
Ys I & II (1989) – Dark Fact
Gihren no Yabou series (1998–) – Garma Zabi
Kessen (2000) – Ishida Mitsunari
Dragon Ball Z Budokai 3 (2005) – Nail
Dragon Ball Z: Budokai Tenkaichi 3 (2007) – Nail 
Tatsunoko vs. Capcom: Ultimate All-Stars (2008) – Ken the Eagle and Tekkaman

Dubbing

Live-action
Ambulance – Papi (A Martinez)
Crisis on Earth-X – Martin Stein / Firestorm (Victor Garber)
Dolittle – Lord Thomas Badgley (Jim Broadbent)
The Girl Next Door – Adult David Moran (William Atherton)
Gone Girl – Rand Elliott (David Clennon)
Harry Potter series – Horace Slughorn (Jim Broadbent)
Hitman: Agent 47 – Dr. Piotr Litvenko (Ciarán Hinds)
Jurassic World: Fallen Kingdom – Senator Sherwood (Peter Jason)
The Lady in the Van – Underwood (Jim Broadbent)
Mars Attacks! – Donald Kessler (Pierce Brosnan)
Midway (1979 TBS edition) – Lieutenant Tom Garth (Edward Albert)
Mirrors 2 – Jack Matheson (William Katt)
Outlander – Colum MacKenzie (Gary Lewis)
Patriots Day – Jeffrey Pugliese (J. K. Simmons)
Robin Hood (2010) – William Marshal (William Hurt)
Robin Hood (2018) – Cardinal Franklin (F. Murray Abraham)
A Series of Unfortunate Events – The Man with a Beard but No Hair (Richard E. Grant)
Speed Racer – Ben Burns (Richard Roundtree)
White Collar – Reese Hughes (James Rebhorn)
ZeroZeroZero – Don Damiano "Minu" La Piana (Adriano Chiaramida)

Animation
Quest for Camelot – Lionel
SWAT Kats: The Radical Squadron – Dr. Viper
Thomas the Tank Engine & Friends – James the Red Engine (Seasons 1-8)
Thomas and the Magic Railroad - James the Red Engine
Pinocchio – Jiminy Cricket
101 Dalmatians – Truck Driver
Yellow Submarine – Paul McCartney

Other roles
Mezamashi TV – Narrator

References

External links
 Official agency profile 
 Katsuji Mori at GamePlaza Haruka Voice Artist Database 
 

1945 births
Living people
Aoni Production voice actors
Japanese male child actors
Japanese male video game actors
Japanese male voice actors
Male voice actors from Tokyo
Tokyo Actor's Consumer's Cooperative Society voice actors
20th-century Japanese male actors
21st-century Japanese male actors